Ruère is a hamlet surrounded with vineyards, situated above Pierreclos (Saône-et-Loire) next to Mâcon, in the south of Burgundy in France. There are approximately fifty inhabitants.

Populated places in Bourgogne-Franche-Comté